The Centro Universitario Sportivo Italiano (CUSI), (English: Italian University Sports Centre) is an association that promotes sports activity at the university level, and is recognized by the Italian National Olympic Committee.

It is headquartered in Rome, Via Angelo Brofferio 7.  The current president is Lorenzo Lentini.

Committees for university sports
Most Italian universities have a CUS (Comitato per lo sport Universitario). As of September 2017, there were 48 such committees.

Activity
Every year since 1947, when the first event was held in Bologna, the CUSI organizes the Campionati Nazionali Universitari (National University Championships).

See also
International University Sports Federation

References

External links

Multisport
Sports governing bodies in Italy
 
 
Italy
Student sports governing bodies